Juan Zacarías Ramírez Candia (born 25 May 1965 in Encarnación, Paraguay) is a former football defender and coach.

Career

As player
Ramírez started his career in local clubs San Juan and Juventud de Hohenau from the city of Encarnación before arriving to 1st division club Atlético Colegiales in 1984. In 1986, he was chosen as the best right-back defender of the Paraguayan league by the press. Despite the award, he did not make the national team that competed in the 1986 FIFA World Cup. In 1988, he signed for Olimpia Asunción where he won national and international titles such as the Copa Libertadores and the Supercopa Sudamericana in 1990. After leaving Olimpia in 1991, Ramírez had brief stints in Paraguayan clubs such as Sol de América and Sportivo Trinidense before retiring in 1994.

As coach
Ramírez received his coaching license in 1997 and has worked with the U20, U17 and Reserve teams of Olimpia in 1997 and 1998. He managed Club Universal in 2000 and 2003, and Atlético Colegiales in 2001. Ramírez also worked as an assistant coach for Club Nacional in 2000.

Titles

As player

References

Paraguayan footballers
Club Olimpia footballers
Club Sol de América footballers
Paraguayan football managers
Living people
1961 births
Association football defenders
Club Sol de América managers